Lieutenant general of Justice Igor Viktorovich Krasnov (born 24 December 1975) is a Russian lawyer serving as the Prosecutor General of Russia since January 22, 2020

Career

Igor Krasnov was born on December 24, 1975, in Arkhangelsk, he was a member of the Lenin Komsomol. He began his service as an investigator in the Kholmogorsky district of the Arkhangelsk region. He graduated from the Law Faculty of Pomor State University.

He started serving in the prosecutor's office in 1997. From 2006 to 2007, Krasnov was an investigator of the central office of the General Prosecutor's Office. In 2007, he joined the Investigative Committee at the prosecutor's office of the Russian Federation.

In 2011, he was appointed senior investigator for particularly important cases of the Investigative Committee of the Russian Federation. 

April 30, 2016, Krasnov was appointed Deputy Chairman of the Investigative Committee of the Russian Federation by Alexander Bastrykin. 

On January 20, 2020, Russian President Vladimir Putin proposed that the Federation Council approve Igor Krasnov as the Prosecutor General of Russia, replacing Yuri Chaika. 

He has the rank of Lieutenant General of Justice and the highest class rank in the prosecutor's office: Actual State Counselor of Justice. He is a member of the Security Council of Russia.

Honours 
 Medal of the Order "For Merit to the Fatherland" II class

References

People from Arkhangelsk
General Prosecutors of Russia
Prosecutors
21st-century Russian lawyers
1975 births
Living people
Russian jurists
Recipients of the Medal of the Order "For Merit to the Fatherland" II class
Russian individuals subject to the U.S. Department of the Treasury sanctions
Specially Designated Nationals and Blocked Persons List